Bhandakhapar is a village in Alirajpur District of Madhya Pradesh, India.

References

Villages in Alirajpur district